Kalyana Sougandhikam may refer to:

Kalyana Sougandhikam (1975 film), Malayalam film released in 1975 starring Vincent and Jayabharathi
Kalyana Sougandhikam (1996 film), Malayalam film released in 1996 starring Dileep and Divya Unni